The Per sempre Alfredo is a one-day road cycling race held annually since 2021 in Toscana, Italy. It is on the UCI Europe Tour calendar as a 1.1 rated event. The race is named after Alfredo Martini and was first held a century after his birth.

Winners

References

External links
Official site 

UCI Europe Tour races
Cycle races in Italy
Recurring sporting events established in 2021
2021 establishments in Italy